Joosten  is a Dutch and German patronymic surname, meaning "son of Joost". Notable people with the surname include:

Albert Joosten (1914–1980), Dutch Montessori teacher
Astrid Joosten (born 1958), Dutch television personality
Jan Joosten van Lodensteijn (c. 1560–1623), Dutch sailor, one of the first Dutchmen in Japan
Jan Joosten (biblical scholar) (born 1959), Belgian professor of the Old Testament
Julie Joosten (born 1980), American-Canadian poet
Kathryn Joosten (1939–2012), American television actress
Patrick Joosten (born 1996), Dutch footballer
Stefanie Joosten (born 1988), Dutch model, singer and actress 
Joostens
Ángela Joostens (1872–1940), Argentinian with Belgian citizenship after whom the Argentine city of Villa Ángela has been named
Maurice Joostens (1862–1910), Belgian diplomat

Dutch-language surnames
German-language surnames
Patronymic surnames